SP6 may refer to :
 SP6 RNA polymerase, a RNA polymerase related to the T7 RNA polymerase
 one of the three versions of the 9x39 mm rifle cartridge
 a model of steam toy made by British manufacturer Mamod
 Service pack 6 in computing
 4685 Karetnikov (1978 SP6), a Main-belt Asteroid discovered on September 27, 1978

 Spleen 6, an acupuncture point above the ankle on the inside of the leg.

 9154 Kolʹtsovo (1982 SP6), a Main-belt Asteroid discovered on September 16, 1982
 Specialist 6, an obsolete enlisted rank in the United States Army. See Specialist (rank).

 Surface Pro 6, a 2-in-1 detachable tablet computer developed by Microsoft